Paulo Julio "PJ" Moraes Clement (21 December 1964 – 28 November 2016) was a Brazilian sports commentator and journalist who last worked for Fox Sports Brasil.

Biography
Clement was born in the state of Rio de Janeiro. He began working professionally as a reporter for Jornal do Brasil in 1987. He also worked for O Dia in 1989. From 1991 to 2001, he worked for the Rio newspaper O Globo. He also worked as a radio sports commentator for Rádio Globo in São Paulo. He later worked for Fox Sports Brasil from 2012 to his death in 2016.

Clement married Flávia Caldeira in 1998. Their son, Theo, was born on 24 August 2009.

Clement died on 28 November 2016 onboard LaMia Flight 2933 which crashed in La Unión, Antioquia, Colombia. He was 51.

References

External links
 Paulo Julio Clement blogs at Fox Sports Brasil 

1964 births
2016 deaths
Brazilian journalists
People from Rio de Janeiro (state)
Victims of the LaMia Flight 2933 crash
Male journalists
Brazilian male writers
20th-century Brazilian people